This is a complete list of National Historic Landmarks in Louisiana,.

The United States National Historic Landmark program is a program of the National Park Service, and recognizes structures, districts, objects, and similar resources according to a list of criteria of national significance.

The state of Louisiana is home to 54 of these landmarks, spanning a range of history from early to modern times. The most recently designated is the St. Charles Streetcar Line, designated during August 2014. Two listings have had their designations withdrawn.

The sternwheeler steamboat Delta Queen has been relocated to Chattanooga and is now listed as an NHL of Tennessee.

Key

National Historic Landmarks

|}

Former National Historic Landmarks

National Park Service areas in Louisiana

National Historic Sites and other National Park Service areas in Louisiana are:
Cane River Creole National Historical Park
Chalmette National Cemetery
El Camino Real de los Tejas National Historic Trail
Jean Lafitte National Historical Park and Preserve
New Orleans Jazz National Historical Park
Poverty Point National Monument
Vicksburg National Military Park (also in Mississippi)

Poverty Point National Monument is listed as a National Park Service area although title for the site has not been transferred from Louisiana to the federal government. Otherwise, excepting the El Camino Real de los Tejas trail, these are federally owned sites and enjoy greater protection than most National Historic Landmarks.

See also
List of National Historic Landmarks by state
National Register of Historic Places listings in Louisiana
Historic preservation
History of Louisiana

References

External links 

National Historic Landmarks Program, at National Park Service
National Park Service listings of National Historic Landmarks

Louisiana
 
History of Louisiana
NationalHistoricLandmarks
National Historic Landmarks